The 2021–22 Odisha Women's League was the 9th edition of the Odisha Women's League, the top Odia professional football league, since its establishment in 2011. Rising Students Club are the defending champions. The league is organised by the Football Association of Odisha (FAO), the official football governing body of Odisha, in association with the Department of Sports and Youth Services (DSYS) of the Government of Odisha.

On 10 February 2022, the jersey launch ceremony for the 2021–22 season was held in the presence of Principal Secretary of the Department of Sports and Youth Services, Vineel Krishna, and the Honorary Secretary of the Football Association of Odisha (FAO), Avijit Paul, at the Kalinga Stadium. The captains and vice-captains of the six participating teams were also present during the jersey launch ceremony. On 12 February 2022, Sailendra Kumar Jena, Joint Secretary of the Department of Sports and Youth Services and the guest of honour for the Opening Ceremony, declared the season open. Odisha Police finished the season unbeated and clinched their first ever Odisha Women's League title.

Teams

Personnel

Standings

Friendlies
Odisha state under-18 women's team played developmental friendlies with Rising Student Club, Odisha Government Press, and Odisha Police and weren't a part of the points table.

References

Sports competitions in Odisha
1
2021–22 domestic women's association football leagues